Mellach was a municipality in Austria which merged in January 2015 into Fernitz-Mellach in the Graz-Umgebung District of Styria, Austria.

Geography 

Subdivisions
The municipality comprises Dillach, Enzelsdorf, Oberenzelsdorf, and Mellach.

References

Cities and towns in Graz-Umgebung District